Otta may refer to:

People
Said Mohamed Otta (born 1992), an Egyptian professional footballer
Walter Otta (born 1973), a retired Argentine footballer
Otta Wenskus (born 1955), a German classical philologist

Places
 Otta, Norway, a town in Sel municipality in Innlandet county, Norway
 Otta Station, a railway station in Sel municipality in Innlandet county, Norway
 Otta (river), a river in Innlandet county, Norway
 Otta, an alternate spelling of Ota, Ogun, a city in Ogun State, Nigeria

Literature and media
 "Otta the Simple", also known as Hildisvini, Freya's lover in Norse mythology
 OttA, "On the Turning Away", a 1987 progressive rock song by Pink Floyd
 Ótta, a 2014 post-metal album by Sólstafir
 Otta Nanayam, a 2005 Malayalam language film

Other
 Otta seal, a type of road surface invented Norway
 Otta (weapon), a curved stick used in the Indian martial art of Kalarippayattu
 Otta-, a preliminary name of the yotta- SI unit prefix

See also
 Ohta (disambiguation)